Eslamabad-e Arab (also Romanized as Eslāmābād-e ‘Arab; also known as Shāhābād-e ‘Arab, Shāhābād, and Moslemābād) is a village in Darbqazi Rural District, in the Central District of Nishapur County, Razavi Khorasan Province, Iran. At the 2006 census, its population was 402, in 114 families.

References 

Populated places in Nishapur County